Kinaros (or Cinara), is a small Greek island in the Aegean Sea, named after the artichoke (kinara) which it produced. It is located west of Kalymnos and Leros and east of Amorgos, 5.5 nautical miles west-southwest of Levitha. It is the second westernmost island of the Dodecanese after Astypalea, and has an area of 4.5 km². The island's highest point is 296m. It was noted by several ancient authors including Pliny the Elder, Pomponius Mela, and Athenaeus.

Population
In 2011, the population of the island according to the census, consisted of 2 inhabitants. This was a Greek couple that returned from Australia and earned a living by raising livestock; as of 2013 only one inhabitant remains.

Events
On 11 February 2016, a Greek Navy Agusta-Bell AB212 PN28 helicopter crashed on the island of Kinaros during a night training mission, killing all three officers aboard.

References

Islands of Greece
Dodecanese
Landforms of Kalymnos (regional unit)
Islands of the South Aegean